Eric Batista de Goes (born 23 July 1984), simply known as Eric, is a Brazilian retired footballer who played as a right back.

His son Rodrygo is also a footballer, and plays for Real Madrid.

Career statistics

References

External links

1984 births
Living people
Brazilian footballers
Association football defenders
Campeonato Brasileiro Série B players
Campeonato Brasileiro Série D players
Rio Claro Futebol Clube players
Oeste Futebol Clube players
Paulista Futebol Clube players
Clube Atlético Juventus players
Clube Atlético Linense players
Mirassol Futebol Clube players
Agremiação Sportiva Arapiraquense players
Ceará Sporting Club players
Boa Esporte Clube players
Guarani FC players
Cuiabá Esporte Clube players
People from Osasco
Footballers from São Paulo (state)